Sanjiv Sam Gambhir (November 23, 1962 – July 18, 2020) was an American physician-scientist.  He was the Virginia and D.K. Ludwig Professor in Cancer Research, Chairman of the Department of Radiology at Stanford University School of Medicine, and a professor by courtesy in the departments of Bioengineering and Materials Science and Engineering at Stanford University.  Additionally, he served as the Director of the Molecular Imaging Program at Stanford (MIPS), Canary Center at Stanford for Cancer Early Detection and the Precision Health and Integrated Diagnostics Center (PHIND). He authored 680 publications and had over 40 patents pending or granted. His work was featured on the cover of over 25 journals including the Nature Series, Science, and Science Translational Medicine. He was on the editorial board of several journals including Nano Letters, Nature Clinical Practice Oncology, and Science Translational Medicine. He was founder/co-founder of several biotechnology companies and also served on the scientific advisory board of multiple companies. He mentored over 150 post-doctoral fellows and graduate students from over a dozen disciplines. He was known for his work in molecular imaging of living subjects and early cancer detection.

Personal
Gambhir was born in Ambala, India, and moved to the US with his parents and sister in 1969. He was raised in Phoenix, Arizona. He was married to Aruna Bodapati Gambhir and lived in the Bay Area. He died July 18, 2020, of cancer of unknown primary. His son, Milan Gambhir, was born in 1998 and died from a glioblastoma in 2015.

Education and employment
Gambhir was a Phi Beta Kappa graduate of Arizona State University. where he received his BS in physics. He then entered the combined M.D-Ph.D. Medical Scientist Training Program (MSTP) at the University of California Los Angeles (UCLA) and received his MD, and his PhD in biomathematics.

His first academic appointment was in 1994, at UCLA, as an assistant professor of molecular and medical pharmacology. He was a clinical attending in the Nuclear Medicine Department at the Center for Health Sciences at UCLA starting in 1997. He was appointed tenure professorship at UCLA in 2003. In 2003, he moved to Stanford University and was appointed professor of radiology, head of nuclear medicine, director of the Molecular Imaging Program at Stanford (MIPS), director of the Precision Health and Integrated Diagnostics (PHIND) Center, division chief of the Canary Center for Cancer Early Detection, and member of the Bio-X Program. He became the Virginia and D.K. Ludwig Professor for Clinical Investigation in Cancer Research, which is an endowed professorship, in 2009. He was appointed the chair of radiology in August 2011.

Honors and awards
Gambhir received the following:
 Taplin Award
 Holst Medal
 Academy of Molecular Imaging (AMI) Distinguished Basic Scientist of the Year Award
 Society for Molecular Imaging (SMI) Achievement Award
 Distinguished Clinical Scientist Award from the Doris Duke Charitable Foundation
 Hounsfield Medal (Imperial College London)
 Fellowship of the American Institute for Medical and Biological Engineering (AIMBE)
 Paul C. Aebersold Award
 Organizer and co-chair for the Nobel Symposium in Imaging (2008)
 Inducted as a member of the American Society for Clinical Investigation (ASCI)
 Tesla Medal
 Elected to the Institute of Medicine (IOM) of the US National Academies
 Parmley Prize
 Radiological Society of North America (RSNA)
 Outstanding Researcher Award
 Gopal Subramanian Lifetime Achievement Award
 George Charles de Hevesy Nuclear Pioneer Award
 Aunt Minnie Award
 Distinguished Scientist Award for Distinguished Contributions to Nuclear Medicine
 Society of Asian American Scientists in Cancer Research Award
 American Association of Indian Scientists in Cancer Research Lifetime Achievement Award
 American Association for the Advancement of Science (AAAS) Fellow Award
 J. Allyn Taylor International Prize in Medicine
 National Academy of Inventors
 American Association for the Advancement of Science
 Basic Science Teaching Award
 Benedict Cassen Prize for Research in Molecular Imaging
 Institute of Electrical and Electronics Engineers (IEEE) Marie Sklodowska-Curie Award - IEEE Advancing Technology for Humanity

Research focus
His research focused on the development of imaging assays to monitor fundamental cellular/molecular events in living subjects with an emphasis on the detection and management of cancer. A particular interest of his research and lab was early cancer detection including combining in vivo and in vitro diagnostics.

Major contributions
PET reporter gene technology, multimodality reporter genes, imaging of gene/cell therapies, imaging of the immune system, imaging of intracellular events in living subjects (e.g., protein-protein interactions), bioluminescence resonance energy transfer (BRET) in living subjects, nanoparticle based imaging, Raman imaging in vivo and photoacoustic molecular imaging with novel imaging agents in living subjects. Decision Management Models for the use of FDG PET in cancer.

Selected publications

 
 

 
 
 
.

 
 
 
 
 
 
 
 
 
 
 

]
 
 
 
  
 
 
 
  
 

 
 
  
 
 
  
 

]

References

External links
 American Society for Clinical Investigation
 Canary Foundation
 Molecular Imaging Program at Stanford
 Multimodality Molecular Imaging Lab (MMIL)
Precision Health and Integrated Diagnostics Center

Cancer researchers
1962 births
2020 deaths
University of California, Los Angeles alumni
Stanford University School of Medicine faculty
People from Phoenix, Arizona
Indian emigrants to the United States
Arizona State University alumni
David Geffen School of Medicine at UCLA faculty
David Geffen School of Medicine at UCLA alumni
Members of the National Academy of Medicine